Hämatom (German for "Hematoma") is a German metal band that formed in 2004 in Speichersdorf, Franconia. They developed their style from Neue Deutsche Härte.

The band concept is based on forming a unity between musical and visual elements, leading to the idea of naming the band members after the four cardinal directions and incorporating intricately designed masks. In the early years, their German lyrics were influenced by European fables, which in time and with the progression of the band transitioned to themes based on societal, religious and socio-critical issues.

The band has released ten studio albums since 2004 and is increasingly gaining chart presence, with the album Wir sind Gott entering the charts  at No. 5.  The focal points of the band are their live performances and the organisation of their own festivals 'Dämonentanz' and 'Das laute Abendmahl' with friends of associated bands.

History 
After their formation in 2004, Hämatom played their first shows in the Franconia vicinity. In April 2005, the band went on tour with J.B.O. selling their self-produced single "Butzemann". The following single "Häschen" was a taster of the upcoming EP Nein. The self-distributed EP Nein was released in September 2005 and comprised nine tracks, some of which were inspired by European fables and nursery rhymes. In 2005, the band also supported Knorkator in Nuremberg and played Earthshaker-Fest with bands such as Nightwish and Manowar and the Burning Fall Festival with Six Feet Under amongst others.

In February 2006, the first headlining tour carried the band through 10 cities all over Germany. On this tour the band offered a special tour single featuring the songs "Leck mich!", "Schmerz" and "Mit dem Kopf durch die Wand", which were to be released on the following album Wut. In autumn 2006, the band toured as a support act for Die Apokalyptischen Reiter through 14 cities of the Republic.

The year 2007 began with J.B.O.'s Rock-Muzik-Tour through Germany, Austria and Switzerland, in which they accompanied Hämatom on their first progression beyond the German borders. In April, the band signed with the record label Megapress to distribute the album Wut via Soulfood. The album was released on 25 January 2008. The song "Leck mich!" from this album quickly became the fan-anthem and was celebrated vociferously at concerts.

On 15 January 2010, the band released their second album with the title Stay Kränk. In 2011 the band played Wacken Open Air and the Walpurgis-Schlacht at the Hexentanz Festival. On 30 September 2011, the third album Wenn man vom Teufel spricht was released and Hämatom performed at on3-südwild. The album entered at position No. 60 of the chart. The 200th show in March 2012 was captured for a live DVD and CD release, which was released in September with the title Schutt und Asche and again, directly entered the chart at No. 8.

In July 2013, the band accepted the invitation to play Sofia-Rocks-Festival in Bulgaria to support Rammstein. On 22 September 2013, the fourth album Keinzeitmensch was released. The single "Alte Liebe rostet nicht" was published as a pre-release title. From October onwards, the band continued to tour through Germany, Austria and Switzerland.

In mid-2014, they began working with producer Kristian Kohlmannslehner in his studio Kohlekeller Studios on their album X. It was released on 31 October 2014, on the band's 10-year anniversary and entered the chart at No. 16. The double-album included cover songs from Marteria, Deichkind, Jan Delay and others, included two new previously unreleased songs and eight re-recorded classics. The 10th anniversary show was held at the Musikcenter in Trockau on 26 December 2014. The show sold out fast with Hämatom playing alongside Knorkator and Stepfather Fred. This winter festival with the name Dämonentanz has been a fixed calendar instalment ever since. The extensive festival season of 2015 led the band to their first performance at Summer Breeze Open Air followed by the Heidenfest-Tour with Die Apokalyptischen Reiter and Korpiklaani through Germany, Austria and Switzerland.

In January 2016, Hämatom released the first single, "Fick das System", from the 25 March release Wir sind Gott, which entered the chart at No. 5 and stayed within the top 100 for several weeks. They also charted in Austria (No. 24) and Switzerland (No. 69). The sold-out release show at Aladin in Bremen on Good Friday was repeated in 2017 and has since also become a fixed annual instalment in Hämatom, band friends and fans calendars. On 17 June, they had the first show in Romania, at Rock la Mureș Festival, in Timiș County.

Band members

Discography

Studio albums 
 Wut (2008)
 Stay Kränk (2010)
 Wenn man vom Teufel spricht (2011)
 Keinzeitmensch (2013)
 X (2014)
 Wir sind Gott (2016)
 Bestie der Freiheit (2018)
 Maskenball (2019)
 Berlin (2021)
 Die Liebe ist Tod (2021)
 Lang lebe der Hass (2022)

EPs 
 Nein (2005)
 Fick das System! (2016)
 #FCKCRN (2020)

Singles 
 "Häschen" (2005)
 "Butzemann" (2005)
 "Alte Liebe rostet nicht" (2013)
 "Fick das System" (2016)

Live DVDs 
 Schutt und Asche (2012)

References

External links 
 
 

German Neue Deutsche Härte music groups
German thrash metal musical groups
Groove metal musical groups
Musical groups established in 2004